The 2010 Florida State Seminoles football team represented Florida State University in the 2010 NCAA Division I FBS college football season. The Seminoles were led by first-year head coach Jimbo Fisher and played their home games at Bobby Bowden Field at Doak Campbell Stadium. They were members of the Atlantic Coast Conference, playing in the Atlantic Division.

They finished the season 10–4, 6–2 in ACC play, and won the Atlantic Division to earn a spot in the ACC Championship Game where they were defeated by Virginia Tech. They were invited to the Chick-fil-A Bowl where they defeated South Carolina.

The 2010 season marked the Seminoles' first ten win season since 2003 and their first appearance in the ACC title game since 2005.

Previous season
Florida State ended the 2009 season with a 7–6 record (4–4 in the ACC). Head coach Bobby Bowden coached his last game at the university on January 1, 2010, in the 2010 Gator Bowl, which they won, 33–21, over the West Virginia Mountaineers. Jimbo Fisher took over the head coaching position in the offseason. The Seminoles were ranked No. 20 in the coaches' poll coming into the 2010 season.

Rankings

Schedule

Recruits

Roster

Regular season

Samford
In Jimbo Fisher's first game as Head Coach, the 'Noles dominated the Samford Bulldogs. The first points of the game came on a 4-yard pass from Christian Ponder to fullback Lonnie Pryor. Florida State put 35 points on the board in the second quarter, thanks to three TD passes by Ponder (B. Reed, L. Pryor, T. Easterling), a 4-yard run by Jermaine Thomas, and a 74-yard punt return by Greg Reid. Samford kicked a FG as time expired to make the score 42–3 heading into halftime. The 'Noles were on cruise control this game and in the second half FSU's backups hung another 17 on Samford, and only allowed 3 points. Jimbo Fisher couldn't have asked for a better first game. The same can not be said for Week 2's trip to Norman.

Oklahoma

After Week 1's blowout victory against Samford, the FSU fanbase started to have a confidence about it. That confidence was quickly shattered and beaten as FSU got man-handled in Norman, Oklahoma by Bob Stoop's Sooners. The defense got shredded, allowing 47 points, and allowing Landry Jones to look like a Heisman candidate. The offense got shut down after scoring a TD on their first possession. The confidence had turned into a gut-wrenching memory of the 2009 team. But, the 'Noles would rebound.

BYU

The 'Noles kicked off a 5-game win streak against BYU after getting routed by Oklahoma a week before. The 'Noles run game was excellent as it accounted for 278 yards and 3 TD's. Christian Ponder bounced back from an awful performance against Oklahoma, completing 66% of his passes, throwing zero interceptions, and adding 50 yards with his feet. Chris Thompson ran for 123 yards, 83 of which came on one touchdown run. Ty Jones added another 95 and a touchdown. The FSU defense dominated most of the game by only allowing 191 yards and 10 points.

Wake Forest

Virginia

Miami (FL)

Boston College

North Carolina State

North Carolina

Clemson

Maryland

Florida

    
    
    
    
    
    

Florida State ended a six-game losing streak to its archrival.

ACC Championship Game: Virginia Tech

Chick-Fil-A Bowl: South Carolina

Awards

Watchlists

Dustin Hopkins
Lou Groza Award semifinalist
Rodney Hudson
Lombardi Award semifinalist
Outland Trophy finalist
Brandon Jenkins
Chuck Bednarik Award semifinalist
 Ryan McMahon
Lombardi Award watchlist
Outland Trophy watchlist
Christian Ponder
Maxwell Award watchlist
Davey O'Brien Award watchlist
William V. Campbell Trophy finalist
Johnny Unitas Golden Arm Award finalist
 Bert Reed
Fred Biletnikoff Award watchlist

Players

 Dustin Hopkins
Academic All-America
Academic All-ACC
 Rodney Hudson
Unanimous Consensus All-American
First-team All-ACC
 Brandon Jenkins
First-team All-ACC
 E.J. Manuel
Academic All-ACC
 Ryan McMahon
Second-team All-ACC
 Christian Ponder
Senior Bowl MVP
James Tatum Award winner
The National Bobby Bowden Award winner
Academic All-American
Academic All-ACC
 Xavier Rhodes
FWAA Freshman All-American
Rivals.com First-Team Freshman All-American
ACC Defensive Rookie of the Year
Second-team All-ACC
 Zebrie Sanders
Academic All-ACC

Post Season

NFL draft
Three seniors would go on and be drafted in the 2011 NFL Draft.

All-star games

References

Florida State
Florida State Seminoles football seasons
Peach Bowl champion seasons
Florida State Seminoles football